Jean-Noël Destréhan de Tours (1754 – October 4, 1823) was a Creole politician in Louisiana and one-time owner of St. Charles Parish's Destrehan Plantation, one of Louisiana's historic antebellum landmarks.  The community of Destrehan was named for his family.

Destréhan was born in colonial New Orleans to Jean Baptiste d'Estrehan and Jeanne Catherine de Gauvret (1729-1773) and was educated in France.  His father was the colonial treasurer for France, and his brother-in-law was Etienne de Boré, who perfected the sugar granulation process and served as New Orleans' first mayor. Destréhan married Marie Claudine Eléonore Robin de Logny in 1786 and bought Destréhan Plantation in 1792.

After the Louisiana Purchase, he served as Speaker of the territorial House of Representatives from 1804 to 1806 before receiving an appointment from President Thomas Jefferson to serve on the Orleans Territorial Council. Destréhan served in this position during 1806 as president of the council. President James Madison appointed him to a second legislative council for Orleans Territory in 1811, where he served again as president. The Orleans Territorial Council crafted a legal system based on French and Spanish civil codes and established Louisiana's parish system of governance.

Destréhan ran for Governor in the first gubernatorial election since statehood, but he placed a distant third behind William C. C. Claiborne and Jacques Villeré. He was selected to serve in the United States Senate instead, but he resigned within a month. He served in the Louisiana State Senate from 1812 to 1817. He again ran for Governor in the 1820 election but placed fourth.

During the 1814-15 Battle of New Orleans threat, Jean N. Destrehan served on the Committee of Defense and three of his sons served in a cavalry unit.

He continued planting, dying at his plantation on October 4, 1823. Destréhan was buried at the St. Charles Borromeo Church cemetery in Destrehan, Louisiana.

Jean Noël Destréhan and sugar plantation slavery

Destréhan pioneered the Creole system of slave labor on his sugar plantations.  A blend between the harsher gang system and the more lenient task system, the Creole approach was to use head slaves called drivers to allot tasks and inspect work, as opposed to relying on a hired overseer.  During the planting and grinding seasons, plantation owners required slaves to work long hours; but during the off-season when the sugar cane fields needed little maintenance, slaves were allowed a considerable amount of time off to grow food, work for themselves, and trade.

Several of Destréhan's slaves participated in the 1811 German Coast Uprising, said to have been the largest slave rebellion in American history.  Destréhan himself served on a local six-member tribunal at the conclusion of the revolt. Destrehan Plantation was the location of the St. Charles Parish slave trials. Three of Destréhan's slaves were among the eighteen conspirators who were summarily executed.

See also
Destrehan Plantation
Etienne de Boré
German Coast
1811 German Coast uprising
History of slavery in Louisiana
Slavery in the colonial United States
Louisiana Creole people
National Register of Historic Places listings in St. Charles Parish, Louisiana

References

Further reading
Lawrence, John. 2008.  Destrehan: the Man, the House, the Legacy. River Road Historical Society.

Lawrence, John H. "Jean Nöel Destrehan." KnowLA Encyclopedia of Louisiana. Ed. David Johnson. Louisiana Endowment for the Humanities. June 18, 2013. Web: http://www.knowla.org 

Rasmussen, Daniel. American Uprising: The Untold Story of America's Largest Slave Revolt. New York: Harper Collins, 2011.
 
Taylor, Hazel. 2009. A Concise History of Destrehan Plantation.  Destrehan Plantation.

External links

Jean Noel Destrehan at 64Parishes.org
Jean Noël Destrehan on KnowLa encyclopedia
Destrehan and his father in Dictionary of La. Biography (Scroll down) La. Historical Association
Official website for Destrehan Plantation

Destrehan Family Papers at  The Historic New Orleans Collection 

1754 births
1823 deaths
Politicians from New Orleans
People from Destrehan, Louisiana
Members of the Territory of Orleans Legislature
United States senators from Louisiana
Louisiana Democratic-Republicans
American people of French descent
American slave owners
Louisiana state senators